Rich Buhler  (July 17, 1946 – May 7, 2012) was an American evangelical Christian radio talk show host, writer, and pastor. He held honorary doctorates from Biola University and Trinity College of Graduate Studies. He is best known for his radio talk show, Talk from the Heart. He created www.truthorfiction.com. He died May 7, 2012 of causes relating to pancreatic cancer.

Career

Journalism and radio

Buhler worked for the on-campus radio while attending Biola University. After graduating at age 17, he got his first job as an office assistant at KFWB in Los Angeles. He worked his way up to the position of journalist and eventually news editor.

Ministry
Buhler was pastor of a Foursquare Christian church for nine years.

Talk show host
In 1981, he left the full-time ministry to start a radio talk show called Talk From the Heart on KBRT. He pitched the show to the station owner Don Crawford and, when no other suitable host could be found, became the host himself. The show was syndicated all over the US and some of Canada.

Buhler wrote several books during this time and was an in-demand speaker at conferences, retreats, churches, and organizations.

He retired from full-time radio in 1996 but returned briefly in 2008.

Entrepreneur
Buhler was the founder and president of Branches Communications an LA company that produced radio, TV, and film media for many years.

He also founded www.TruthOrFiction.com in 1999.

He also published "The eRumor Report," a regular email update.

Talk From the Heart 
In 1980, Buhler was asked to put together nationally syndicated talk show. The show is considered to have been "pioneering" in Christian talk radio.

Death

On May 7, 2012 Rich Buhler died from pancreatic cancer.

Books 
 Love, No Strings Attached (1987, Thomas Nelson )
 Pain and Pretending (1988, Thomas Nelson)
 New Choices, New Boundaries (1991, Thomas Nelson )
 Be Good to Yourself (1994, Thomas Nelson )
 Shame (Unpublished)
 The Stranger Who Belonged (Unpublished)

References 

1946 births
2012 deaths
20th-century American male writers
20th-century American non-fiction writers
American alternative journalists
American conservative talk radio hosts
American talk radio hosts
Biola University alumni
California Republicans
Deaths from cancer in California
Deaths from pancreatic cancer
Journalists from California
People from Villa Park, California